Season twenty-six of Dancing with the Stars, titled Dancing with the Stars: Athletes, premiered on April 30, 2018, on the ABC network. The four-week season, the shortest ever, featured a cast of current and former athletes.

On May 21, Olympic figure skater Adam Rippon and Jenna Johnson were crowned the champions, while Washington Redskins cornerback Josh Norman and Sharna Burgess, and former Olympic figure skater Tonya Harding and Sasha Farber, were both announced as runners-up during the live finale. It was later revealed that Josh and Sharna had placed second, while Tonya and Sasha had placed third.

Cast

Couples
The professional dancers were announced on April 12, 2018. The eight professionals returning from last season were Lindsay Arnold, Alan Bersten, Sharna Burgess, Witney Carson, Artem Chigvintsev, Keo Motsepe, Gleb Savchenko, and Emma Slater. The two remaining professional dancers were both in the troupe last season, and had previously been professional dancers on the show: Sasha Farber and Jenna Johnson. The dance troupe for season 26 consisted of Artur Adamski, Brandon Armstrong, Hayley Erbert, and Britt Stewart. Additionally, professional dancer Morgan Larson, who performed on the Dancing with the Stars: Light Up the Night tour, joined the troupe for season 26. 

The cast was announced on April 13 on Good Morning America.

Hosts and judges
Tom Bergeron and Erin Andrews returned as hosts, while Carrie Ann Inaba, Len Goodman, and Bruno Tonioli returned as judges. On May 7, season 24 champion Rashad Jennings returned as a guest judge, and on May 14, runner-up David Ross did as well.

Scoring charts

Notes

 : This was the lowest score of the week.
 : This was the highest score of the week.
 :  This couple finished in first place.
 :  This couple finished in second place.
 :  This couple finished in third place.
 :  This couple was eliminated.
 : The couples were scored on a 40-point scale due to the presence of a guest judge.

Highest and lowest scoring performances
The best and worst performances in each dance according to the judges' 30-point scale are as follows. Scores from guest judges are not included.

Couples' highest and lowest scoring dances
Scores are based upon a potential 30-point maximum. Scores from guest judges are not included.

Weekly scores
Individual judges' scores in the charts below (given in parentheses) are listed in this order from left to right: Carrie Ann Inaba, Len Goodman, Bruno Tonioli.

Week 1: First Dances
The couples danced the cha-cha-cha, foxtrot, salsa or Viennese waltz. Couples are listed in the order they performed.

For the first time in the show's history, viewers were able to vote for the couples online so that the results of the vote could be used to determine the first two eliminations that same evening.

Week 2: Team Dance Night
Individual judges' scores in the chart below (given in parentheses) are listed in this order from left to right: Carrie Ann Inaba, Rashad Jennings, Len Goodman, Bruno Tonioli.

The couples performed one unlearned dance and a team dance celebrating an iconic decade in sports. The paso doble and quickstep were introduced. Couples are listed in the order they performed.

Week 3: MVP Night (Semifinals)
Individual judges' scores in the chart below (given in parentheses) are listed in this order from left to right: Carrie Ann Inaba, David Ross, Len Goodman, Bruno Tonioli.

The couples performed one unlearned dance dedicated to the "MVP" in their lives, and participated in paired dance-offs for extra points. Contemporary, jive, and rumba were introduced. Former contestants were brought in to mentor the couples for the dance-offs. Couples are listed in the order they performed.

Week 4: Finals
The final three couples performed one unlearned dance inspired by their journey on the show and a freestyle. Jazz was introduced. Couples are listed in the order they performed.

Dance chart 
The celebrities and professional partners danced one of these routines for each corresponding week:
 Week 1 (First Dances): One unlearned dance
 Week 2 (Team Dance Night): One unlearned dance & team dance
 Week 3 (MVP Night; Semifinals): One unlearned dance & ballroom battles
 Week 4 (Finals): One unlearned dance & freestyle

Notes

 :  This was the highest scoring dance of the week.
 :  This was the lowest scoring dance of the week.
 :  This couple gained bonus points for winning this dance-off.
 :  This couple gained no bonus points for losing this dance-off.

Ratings

References

External links

Dancing with the Stars (American TV series)
2018 American television seasons